Catriona Carey is an Irish former international hockey player and camogie player. Convicted of tax offences in 2008 and of theft and fraud in 2020, in early 2022, RTÉ Investigates reported that Carey was connected to fraudulent business practices.

Sport
From Gowran in County Kilkenny, Carey is the sister of hurler D. J. Carey. As a camogie player, Carey was a member of the Clara GAA team that won the Féile na nGael Camogie Division 1 competition in 1992. She later went on to play for the Kilkenny camogie team.

Also playing field hockey, she earned 72 caps for the Ireland women's national field hockey team, including at the 2005 Women's EuroHockey Nations Championship in Dublin. She retired from international competition in 2006, after the 2006 Women's Intercontinental Cup, though continued to play club hockey for Hermes Ladies' Hockey Club. She reportedly rejoined the Irish squad in 2008.

Financial activities
Trained as an accountant, she worked with her brother's cleaning company. In 2008, while at the company, Carey was fined €1,500 after pleading guilty to knowingly producing an incorrect invoice to the Revenue Commissioners in connection with VAT. She was also found guilty of furnishing incorrect information to Revenue in 2006, and claiming a repayment of VAT to which she was not entitled. She resigned within six months of the court hearing. After her departure from the firm, alleged "financial irregularities" were the subject of review by auditors and an investigation by the Garda Bureau of Fraud Investigation. As of 2012, these investigations had "not led to any prosecutions".

In 2020, Catriona Carey was convicted of fraud and theft, after forging a cheque to make it payable to her, rather than the payee intended by the business that hired her as an accountant.

In February 2022, RTÉ Investigates reported that she was connected to fraudulent business practices. The RTÉ report referred to an "elaborate scam" and noted that the Gardaí had received several complaints about Carey and her company, Careysfort Asset Estates. An article in the Irish Independent, which described Carey as a "convicted swindler", suggested that the Garda National Economic Crime Bureau (GNECB) had received at least 30 such complaints by late February 2022. The GNECB subsequently seized her car and searched her home as part of an investigation into alleged fraud. By June 2022, the Central Bank of Ireland had issued a public warning about Carey's company, identifying it as an "unauthorised company" and noting that it was "a criminal offence for an unauthorised firm / person to provide financial services in Ireland". Also in mid-2022, Carey was given a suspended sentence and disqualified from driving for several driving offences.

She was sued by Bank of Ireland for reputed outstanding debts and, after "defaulting on her mortgage payments for nearly 10 years", Carey's own home was repossessed in November 2022. 

In late 2022, a bench warrant was issued for the arrest of the former secretary of Carey's company, Careysfort Asset Estates. Carey herself was arrested in early 2023 as part of an investigation by the Corporate Enforcement Authority (separate from the parallel GNECB investigation). She was questioned for 12 hours before being released without charge.

See also
 Rodolphus Allen Family Private Trust

References

Kilkenny camogie players
Irish field hockey players
21st-century Irish businesspeople